Two ships have sailed for the British East India Company (EIC), under the name Berrington:

 made two voyages for the EIC; she was wrecked in 1730 at the entrance to Bombay Harbour while on her third voyage.
 made six voyages as an East Indiaman for the British East India Company (EIC). She then became a West Indiaman before again making a voyage under the auspices of the EIC bringing rice from Bengal to England for the British government. She returned to Indian waters and was last listed in 1807.

Ship names
Age of Sail merchant ships of England